Ramatroban (INN) (also known as BAY u3405) is a thromboxane receptor antagonist.

It is also a DP2 receptor antagonist.

It is indicated for the treatment of coronary artery disease. It has also been used for the treatment of asthma.  

It has been suggested that ramatroban, by modulating DP2 receptor, can reverse viremia-associated proinflammatory and prothrombotic processes which are similar to those induced by SARS-Cov-2. Hence, ramatroban, that has been used for the treatment of allergic rhinitis in Japan for the past two decades with a well established safety profile, merits investigation as a novel immunotherapy for the treatment of COVID-19 disease, although no clinical trial has yet been conducted.

Ramatroban was developed by the German pharmaceutical company Bayer AG and is co-marketed in Japan by Bayer Yakuhin then marketed by Kyorin Pharmaceutical and Nippon Shinyaku Co., Ltd. under the trade name Baynas.

References

External links
  Baynas Tablets Prescribing Information

Antiplatelet drugs
Sulfonamides